Darreh Dang (also Romanized as Darreh-ye Dang) is a village in Zaz-e Gharbi Rural District, Zaz va Mahru District, Aligudarz County, Lorestan Province, Iran. At the 2006 census, its population was 451, in 67 families, making it the most populous village in the rural district.

References 

Towns and villages in Aligudarz County